This is a list of American football quarterbacks who have started for the Virginia Tech Hokies football team and the years they participated on the Virginia Tech Hokies football team.

Six Virginia Tech quarterbacks have been taken in the National Football League draft since 1936.  Michael Vick was the first overall selection in the 2001 NFL Draft.  Besides the NFL, Virginia Tech quarterbacks have also played professionally in the Arena Football League, Canadian Football League, XFL, Indoor Football League, Southern Indoor Football League, and Lone Star Football League.

Three former Virginia Tech quarterbacks went on to be head coaches in Division I-A or professional football.  Bruce Arians is the current head coach of the Tampa Bay Buccaneers of the National Football League.

Key

*Note: Under NCAA Rules, Virginia Tech does not count statistics from bowl games in the team or individual statistical totals for games prior to the 2002 season.

Starting quarterbacks
These quarterbacks have started college football games for the Virginia Tech Hokies. They are listed in order of the date of each player's first start at quarterback for the Hokies.

Most games as starting quarterback
These quarterbacks have started for the Hokies in regular season games (from start of 1987 season until the end of 2017 season).

Career passing records

(from Starting QB's at start of 1987 season until end of 2017 season)

References

External links
 Year-By-Year Passing Leaders

Virginia Tech Hokies

Virginia Tech Hokies quarterbacks